Jalal Khan is a legendary figure in the history of the Baloch people who led the Baloch from Persia to Makran.

Jalal Khan had four sons, Rind Khan, Hoth Khan, Lashar Khan, and Kora Khan, and a daughter, Bibi Jato, who was married to his nephew (and her cousin) Murad. Jalal Khan also had two known brothers, Mir Ali and Mir Nos. One of his known grandsons is Mir Aalii, son of King Hoth and his great grandsons include Mir Dostein Hoth from the story/folklore “Sassui Punnuh”. Baloch tribes derive their eponymous names from Jalal Khan's children, these five are believed to be the founders of the main Balochi divisions: Rind, Lashari (Laashaar), Hoth/Hooth, Korai and Jatoi.

He may be the same as Jalal ad-Din Mingburnu, the last ruler of the Khwarezmian Empire.

Not much is known about his ancestry and the origins of Baloch people in general.

Forty-four tribes were formed in the 12th century while Jalal Khan was the ruler.

All 150+ tribes/sub tribes/clans of the Baloch are his direct descendants.

See also 
King Hoth Baloch
Rind Khan
Baloch people
The Hoth Tribe
The Rind Tribe
The Laghari Tribe
The Jatoi Tribe

References

Medieval history of Iran
Legendary people